Katsumi Yamada (6 June 1905 – 1970) was a Japanese ski jumper. He competed in the individual event at the 1932 Winter Olympics.

References

1905 births
1970 deaths
Japanese male ski jumpers
Japanese male Nordic combined skiers
Olympic ski jumpers of Japan
Olympic Nordic combined skiers of Japan
Ski jumpers at the 1932 Winter Olympics
Nordic combined skiers at the 1932 Winter Olympics
Sportspeople from Sapporo